Combs may refer to:

Places

France 

 Combs-la-Ville, a commune in the southeastern suburbs of Paris

United Kingdom 

Combs, Derbyshire, England
Combs, Suffolk, England

United States 

Combs, Arkansas, a community
Combs, Kentucky, a community
Combs Township, Carroll County, Missouri

Other uses
Comb, plural form
Combs (surname)

See also
Comb (disambiguation)
Combes (disambiguation)
 Justice Combs (disambiguation)
 Coombs (disambiguation)
 Cwm (disambiguation)
 Coombes